The following is a list of notable events and releases of the year 1954 in Norwegian music.

Events

June
 1 – The 2nd Bergen International Festival started in Bergen, Norway (June 1 – 15).

Deaths 

 January
 21 – Per Reidarson, composer, violinist, and music critic (born 1879).

 March
 21 – Hanna Marie Hansen, composer, violinist, and music critic (born 1875).

Births 

 January
 14 – Gunnar Andreas Berg, guitarist, music teacher, and record label manager.

 February
 16 – Torbjørn Sunde, jazz trombonist.
 18 – Bertil Palmar Johansen, contemporary composer and violinist.

 March
 17 – Bjørn Eidsvåg, singer and songwriter.
 21 – Haakon Graf, jazz pianist, keyboardist, composer, music arranger and record producer.
 27
 Helge Iberg, contemporary composer.
 Paolo Vinaccia, composer, jazz drummer, and percussionist.

 April
 1 – Knut Værnes, jazz guitarist, composer, and band leader.
 6 – Knut Stensholm, drummer in the band Sambandet (died 2010).
 22 – Håkon Berge, contemporary composer, conductor, and music arranger.
 28 – Frank Jakobsen, jazz drummer.

 June
 26 – Øystein Norvoll, jazz guitarist.

 July
 14 – Kristin Solli Schøien, author and composer.
 19 – Cecilie Ore, composer.
 25 – Svein Olav Blindheim, jazz double bassist, composer, and writer.

 August
 21 – Bodil Niska, jazz saxophonist.

 September
 8 – Hans Fredrik Jacobsen, multi-instrumentalist and composer.

 October
 8 – Lars Kristian Brynildsen, clarinetist, Bergen Philharmonic Orchestra (died 2005).

 November
 8 – Kåre Garnes, jazz upright bassist.

 December
 10 – Edvard Askeland, jazz bassist.
 18 – Kåre Nordstoga, organist.

See also
 1954 in Norway
 Music of Norway

References

 
Norwegian music
Norwegian
Music
1950s in Norwegian music